The 1986–87 North West Counties Football League was the fifth in the history of the North West Counties Football League, a football competition in England. Teams were divided into three divisions.

Division One

Division One featured 2 new teams:

 Kirkby Town promoted as champions from Division Two
 Rossendale United promoted as runners-up from Division Two

League table

Division Two

Division Two featured 4 new teams:

 Prescot Cables, relegated from Division One
 Formby, relegated from Division One
 Blackpool Mechanics promoted as champions from Division Three
 Oldham Town promoted as runners-up from Division Three

League table

Division Three

Division Three featured 4 new teams:

 Ford Motors, relegated from Division Two
 Nantwich Town, relegated from Division Two
 Flixton, joined from the Manchester League
 Ashton Town, joined from the Manchester League

League table

Promotion and relegation

Division One
12 sides (highlighted in the table in green) were promoted to the Northern Premier League First Division. No teams were relegated.

Division two
Droylsden and Lancaster City moved to the Northern Premier League First Division while 10 teams (highlighted in the table in lightgreen) were promoted to the Division One. Newcastle Town, Maine Road and Vauxhall Motors joined the Division as newly admitted teams. No teams were relegated.

Division Three
All sides were promoted to Division Two as Division Three was disbanded at the end of the season.

External links 
 North West Counties Football League Tables at RSSSF

North West Counties Football League seasons
7